Tuberaria lignosa is a species of perennial rock-rose native to the western Mediterranean region.

Description
Tuberaria lignosa is a perennial herb, often woody towards the base. The inflorescence is lax, with each flower  in diameter.

Distribution and ecology
Tuberaria lignosa is found around the western Mediterranean Basin, in parts of Italy, France, mainland Spain, Portugal, Morocco, Tunisia, Algeria and the Canary Islands.

Taxonomy
The species was first described by Carl Linnaeus in his 1753 work , as "Cistus tuberaria". It was later transferred to the genus Helianthemum, and when Michel Félix Dunal erected Helianthemum sect. Tuberaria in 1824, he designated "Helianthemum tuberaria" as its type species. In 1827, Robert Sweet published a description of "Helianthemum lignosum", but this name was invalid as a junior synonym of H. tuberaria. In 1836, Édouard Spach raised this subgenus to the rank of genus as Tuberaria; because the International Code of Nomenclature for algae, fungi, and plants forbids tautonyms (such as "Tuberaria tuberaria"), the next oldest available name has to be used. In 1922, Gonçalo Sampaio introduced the combination Tuberaria lignosa, which is the name generally used today. Some botanists consider the species part of the genus Xolantha, in which case it is known as Xolantha tuberaria.

Medical research
The plant has been researched for medical purposes in cancer treatment. An aqueous extract of Tuberaria lignosa inhibited cell growth, altered the cell cycle profile, and induced apoptosis of NCI-H460 Tumor Cells.

References

External links
Dunal's publication of Helianthemum sect. Tuberaria in de Candolle's Prodromus

Cistaceae
Flora of Southwestern Europe
Flora of Italy
Flora of Sicily
Flora of North Africa
Flora of the Canary Islands
Plants described in 1753
Taxa named by Carl Linnaeus